Centerville, Arkansas may refer to:
Centerville, Faulkner County, Arkansas, an unincorporated community in Faulkner County
Centerville, Hempstead County, Arkansas, an unincorporated community in Hempstead County
Centerville, Jackson County, Arkansas, an unincorporated community in Jackson County
Centerville, Yell County, Arkansas, an unincorporated community and census-designated place in Yell County